Japetella is a genus of pelagic octopods from the subfamily Bolitaeninae in the family Amphitretidae. It contains at least one species but another two have been questionably raised with Japetella heathi being of doubtful validity, although currently accepted and Japetella taningi being classed as a nomen dubium.

The genus contains bioluminescent species.

Japetella diaphana inhabits the oxygen minimum zone of the eastern tropical Pacific Ocean. It is a species of midwater octopus which is relatively abundant in the Gulf of Mexico compared to the Monterey Bay. It has a bioluminescent, yellow ring which starts at the base of its tentacles, of which all are of the same size. The arms are also very short, no longer than the mantle length. It has been proposed that the female octopus uses the ring to communicate with the opposite gender, perhaps to attract the male to mate. Its chromatophores allow it to go almost fully transparent with spots, to be of a solid orange. The octopus never touches the seafloor, living its entire life in the water column. The female's bioluminescent ring may be of a specific wavelength, to prevent miscommunication and predator attraction.

References

Octopuses
Cephalopod genera
Bioluminescent molluscs